Gangarampur railway station is located in Dakshin Dinajpur district in the Indian state of West Bengal. It serves Gangarampur city and the surrounding areas. Gangarampur station was built in 2004, and the first train ran on December 30, 2004. The station is located at the south side of the town, near Gangarampur College. A few express trains, like the Gour Express, Tebhaga Express and Balurghat–Siliguri Intercity Express, Howrah Express, Malda Town passenger, Old Malda passenger, stop at Gangarampur railway station.

Gangarampur Railway Bridge
Trains cross The Gangarampur Railway Bridge over Punarbhaba River near Gangarampur railway station.

References

Railway stations in Dakshin Dinajpur district
Railway stations opened in 2004
Gangarampur
Katihar railway division